Albert Bartleton Groves (1866 - 1925), also known as A.B. Groves or Albert B. Groves, was an American architect who practiced in the St. Louis, Missouri area.

Groves was born in Providence, Rhode Island and attended architectural courses at Cornell University.  After periods studying in France and Italy, and working under Denver architect Frank E. Edbrooke for two years, Groves began practicing in St. Louis with partners as Gable, Weber and Groves in 1891.  The firm Weber & Groves ended in 1905 with the death of Weber.  Groves practiced independently thereafter.

Groves designed his share of houses in St. Louis's private places, and by 1921 had designed 18 separate churches in the area, but made a specialty of the design of relatively simple concrete and brick factories for garment manufacturers in the city, who demanded speed, flexibility and ingenuity.  Grove designed multiple buildings for these manufacturers—eleven separate buildings and an 8-story headquarters for Brown Shoe alone—which, along with alterations, expansions, and changes of ownership, can present a challenge in identifying his work.

Work 

Buildings designed by Groves (or Weber & Groves) include (in St. Louis if not otherwise indicated):

 Fountain Park Congregational Church, 1895 (Gable, Weber & Groves), 1895
 American Brake Company Building, 1920 N. Broadway (Weber & Groves), 1901
 Brown Shoe Company's Homes-Take Factory, aka the International Hat Company Warehouse, 1201 Russell Blvd. (Weber & Groves), 1904
 Union Avenue Christian Church, 733 Union, 1904 (chapel), 1907 (main bldg)
 Grim Building, 113-115 E. Washington St., Kirksville, Missouri (Weber & Groves), 1905
 Drygoodsman Building, 1726 Washington, 1907
 Maryland Hotel, 205 N. Ninth St., 1907
 Blackwell-Wielandy Building, 1601-09 Locust St. 1907
 Tuscan Temple, 5015 Westminster Place, in the Holy Corners Historic District, 1908
 East Bank Building, 1511 Washington Avenue, 1909
 Monogram Building, for milliners Rosenthal-Sloan, 1706 Washington Avenue, 1910 
 First National Bank, 100 N. Main, St. Charles, Missouri, a contributing element to the St. Charles Historic District, 1911
 City Hospital Main Building, Lafayette Street, 1912
 Majestic Hotel, 1017-23 Pine St. and 200-10 N. 11th St., 1914
 Missouri State Life Insurance Company, later the General American Life Insurance Co. Buildings, 1501-1511 Locust St., 1914, expanded 1923
 Westminster Presbyterian Church, 5300 Delmar, 1916
 Moloney Electric Company Building, 1141-1151 S. 7th St. for the 1916 expansion
 Brown Shoe Company Factory, 212 S. State St., Litchfield, Illinois, 1917
 Advertising Building, 1627-1629 Locust St., 1917
 McElroy-Sloan Shoe Company, 2035 Washington, a contributing property to the Lucas Avenue Industrial Historic District, 1919
 McElroy-Sloan Shoe Company, 2101 Lucas (715 N. 21st Street), a contributing property to the Lucas Avenue Industrial Historic District, 1920
 Sporting News Building, later the Emerson Electric Company Building, 2012-2018 Washington Ave., 1920
 First Presbyterian Church of Winnebago, Winnebago, Illinois, 1921
 New Masonic Temple (St. Louis), 3681 Lindell Boulevard, as associate architect with Eames and Young, 1926
 Principia Page-Park YMCA Gymnasium, 5569 Minerva Ave. St. Louis, 1910 (expanded by William B. Ittner in 1919)
 Stix, Baer and Fuller Dry Goods Company's "Grand Leader" Relay Station, 3712-3748 Laclede Ave., 3717 Forest Park Blvd. St. Louis
 One or more buildings in the City Hospital Historic District, Roughly bounded by Lafayette Ave., Grattan St., Carroll St., Dillon St., St. Ange St., 14th St., and Carroll St., in St. Louis
 One or more buildings in Locust Street Automotive District, 2914-3124 Locust and 3043 Olive St. Louis
 One or more buildings in a boundary increase to the Locust Street Automotive District, 3133-3207 & 3150-3202 Locust St., in St. Louis

References

1866 births
1925 deaths
19th-century American architects
Architects from Missouri
People from Providence, Rhode Island
20th-century American architects